History of Tarnobrzeg – In the late 16th century, the area of current Tarnobrzeg, Subcarpathian Voivodeship, Poland emerged as a local center of industry, with several bloomeries mentioned here in 1565. The Tarnowski family sold the products of the bloomeries in Sandomierz and Baranów Sandomierski, deciding that the best solution for the family business would be to establish its own independent urban center. On May 28, 1593, King Zygmunt III Waza granted Magdeburg rights to the family village, with permission to stock wine, to make two fairs a year, as well as two markets a week, on Tuesdays and Fridays. Tarnodwor, as the town was called, was located on a plain near the Vistula river, in the middle of the large family estate, near the Dzików Castle.

The center of the town was marked by a market square, which now is called Bartosz Glowacki Square. No plans were made for a defensive wall or any kind of fortifications, as Tarnodwor was designed to be a trade and craft center. The creation of the town was accelerated in 1620–1640, when it belonged to Michał Stanisław Tarnowski, the Castellan of Wojnicz. A town hall was built, the medieval church at Miechocin was expanded, together with the Dzików Castle. Jewish settlers came to Tarnodwor, and by the 1650s, the town was a well-established urban center of southeastern corner of Lesser Polands Sandomierz Voivodeship. Swedish invasion of Poland (1655–1660) brought widespread destruction to the area, as the Swedes destroyed Tarnodwor, together with adjacent villages. Most likely, the Dzików Castle was saved in unknown circumstances.

After the Swedish invasion (1655–1660), Tarnodwor was so devastated that its residents asked King John III Sobieski to confirm privileges granted to the town by King Zygmunt III Waza. On April 14, 1681, Sobieski agreed, furthermore giving permission for additional fair. Tarnodwor however developed very slowly, due to numerous fires, as well as wars, such as the Great Northern War, when armies of the Russian Empire, Swedish Empire and the Kingdom of Saxony caused destruction comparable to that of the Swedish Deluge.

After the death of King Augustus II the Strong, Polish nobility re-elected Stanisław Leszczyński. Powerful neighbors of the Commonwealth disagreed with this decision, promoting their own candidate, Augustus III of Poland. Representatives of the nobility gathered at the Dzików Castle in October 1734, to call a confederation in order to defend Leszczyński. The choice of Dzików was purely random, as its owner, Józef Mateusz Tarnowski was not engaged in politics. The confederation failed, and in 1772, following first partition of Poland, Tarnodwor was annexed by the Habsburg Empire, where it remained until 1918.

From 1772 until 1795, Tarnodwor was located near the Polish – Austrian border. Since 1815 (see Congress Poland), the town lay at the Austrian – Russian border. In 1809, the Dzików Castle was destroyed during the Polish–Austrian War, and in 1815, the area was flooded by the Vistula. After the November Uprising, Waleria and Jan Feliks Tarnowski decided to leave Russian-occupied Warsaw and moved to Dzikowiec. They initiated restoration of the castle, employing Italian architect Francesco Maria Lanci, who worked on the project in 1834–1858, turning the complex into a neo-Gothic English style residence. The castle was highly regarded by Polish nobility, who frequently visited it, and since the Tarnowski family was much liked by local peasantry, the Galician slaughter did not take place here.

The January Uprising, which began in 1863, was widely supported by local residents as well as the Tarnowskis. Several volunteers crossed the border, weapons, medicines and food were smuggled, and Dominican nuns from Wielowieś opened a hospital for the insurgents. After the failed uprising, a public hospital was opened in 1864, with a new building completed by 1884. Tarnobrzeg slowly developed, because in 1887 a rail connection with Dębica and Rozwadów was opened. On September 8, 1904, Bishop of Przemyśl Sebastian Pelczar crowned the painting of Our Lady of Dzików, and on the next day, a monument of Bartosz Glowacki was unveiled, with thousands participating in the event. In 1913, a new rail station was opened, and in August 1914, World War I began. Due to Tarnobrzeg's location near the Austrian-Russian border, the town was the area of heavy fighting, and in the autumn 1915, during the offensive of the Russian Imperial Army, Tarnobrzeg was almost completely destroyed. In October 1918, Polish authorities emerged in the town, but beginnings of the Second Polish Republic were marred by violence, as local revolutionaries created the so-called Republic of Tarnobrzeg. In September 1927, meeting of Conservative Movement took place at the Dzików Castle, with Walery Sławek as one of the guests. In December of the same year, a dangerous fire took place in the castle, in which 9 people died. In 1929, President Ignacy Mościcki visited Tarnobrzeg.

On September 2, 1939, the town was bombed by the Luftwaffe, and on September 13, first Wehrmacht units entered Tarnobrzeg. Soon afterwards, first Polish conspirational organizations emerged, including structures of Union of Armed Struggle, which later turned into the Home Army (AK). The Tarnobrzeg Region of the AK was known by a codename "Twarog". Jedrusie, the legendary guerrilla force, was created by young residents of Tarnobrzeg. German occupation lasted until August 4, 1944, when the town was captured by the Red Army. Soon afterwards, Tarnobrzeg and its county was the area of a civil war, between Soviets and their Communist allies, and patriotic Polish groups, headed by such people as Hieronim Dekutowski and Kazimierz Bogacz. Fighting continued until the early 1950s.

In 1953, rich deposits of sulfur were discovered in the area of Tarnobrzeg by professor Stanisław Pawłowski. This fact brought far-reaching changes for the town, whose population quickly grew. Newly opened mines at Piaseczno, Machow and Jeziorko gave jobs to thousands of newcomers, for whom new districts were built. In 1975 Tarnobrzeg became the seat of a voivodeship, but it had to share its status with three other towns. Tarnobrzeg was administrative capital of the province, Sandomierz had the status of cultural capital, and Stalowa Wola was the region's industrial capital. The Tarnobrzeg Voivodeship ceased to exist in 1999.

See also 
 History of Poland
 History of Galicia (Eastern Europe)